Polygala crenata is a species of flowering plant in the family Polygalaceae. It occurs in Alabama.

References

crenata